Anthony Costa is an Australian soccer player who plays as a striker for Bonnyrigg White Eagles.

Career

Adelaide United
Costa made his debut for Adelaide United in a home match against Sydney FC. He came on as a substitute for the injured Sergio Cirio in the 31st minute. In the 72nd minute he was fouled by Matthew Jurman in the box, and the resulting penalty kick was converted by Jake Barker-Daish, giving Adelaide the lead. However 10 minutes later Corey Gameiro equalised for Sydney and the game ended with the scores level.

Costa was awarded the 'Youth Team Highest Goal Scorer' award for the 2013–14 season.

References

External links

Living people
1994 births
Australian soccer players
Adelaide City FC players
Adelaide United FC players
A-League Men players
National Premier Leagues players
Association football forwards